The 2011 Orange Open Guadeloupe was a professional tennis tournament played on hard courts. It was the first edition of the tournament which was part of the 2011 ATP Challenger Tour. It took place in Le Gosier, Guadeloupe between 14 and 19 March 2011.

ATP entrants

Seeds

 Rankings are as of March 7, 2011.

Other entrants
The following players received wildcards into the singles main draw:
  Fabio Fognini
  Daniel Gimeno Traver
  Gianni Mina
  Jarkko Nieminen

Champions

Singles

 Olivier Rochus def.  Stéphane Robert, 6–2, 6–3

Doubles

 Riccardo Ghedin /  Stéphane Robert def.  Arnaud Clément /  Olivier Rochus, 6–2, 5–7, [10–7]

External links
Official Site
ITF Search 
ATP official site

2011 ATP Challenger Tour
2011
2011 in French tennis
2011 in Guadeloupean sport